Arthur C. Lloyd (birth unknown – death unknown) was a Welsh professional rugby league footballer who played in the 1930s.

Playing career

International honours
Arthur Lloyd won a cap for Wales while at York in 1931.

Challenge Cup Final appearances
Arthur Lloyd played  in York's 8-22 defeat by Halifax in the 1930–31 Challenge Cup Final during the 1930–31 season at Wembley Stadium, London on Saturday 2 May 1931, in front of a crowd of 40,368.

References

Place of birth missing
Rugby league halfbacks
Rugby league wingers
Wales national rugby league team players
Welsh rugby league players
Year of birth missing
York Wasps players
Place of death missing
Year of death missing